Fortune Sound Club is a nightclub, established in 2009, which is located in Chinatown, Vancouver, BC.

Origins
Fortune originated as a nightclub with a very niche-oriented demographic. What was once considered the ‘hipster’ nightclub of Vancouver, Fortune hosts multiple cultural nights each week, and supports events catered towards the alt-underground community and the local scene. Fortune Sound is known for not only club nights & concerts but unique community gatherings such as art shows, pop up shops, food fairs, mental health seminars & much more. Previously, its building served as the location of the infamous Ming’s Restaurant before closure.[.

References

Nightclubs in Vancouver
Canadian companies established in 2009